Linnameeskond may refer to the following Estonian association football clubs: 
Maardu Linnameeskond
Paide Linnameeskond
Paide Linnameeskond II
Pärnu Linnameeskond